LNP may refer to:

In science

Lecture Notes in Physics, a book series in the field of physics.
Linear-Nonlinear-Poisson cascade model, a model of neural responses.
Lipid nanoparticles, a drug delivery system in pharmacology.
 LNP section, a structural steel standard for a family of unequal angle steel sections.

In sport
Lega Nazionale Professionisti, Italian football league.
Liga Nacional Profesional, Honduran football league.

In politics and government

 Liberal–National Coalition, Australia
 Liberal National Party of Queensland
 Liberian National Police
Local Nature Partnership, environmental coalitions in England

Others
Local number portability, of telephone numbers
Lonesome Pine Airport, Virginia, US, IATA code
 LNP (newspaper), Lancaster, Pennsylvania, US
 LNP Media Group, publisher of the LNP newspaper